m/s is the symbol for metre per second, a unit of both speed and velocity.

example: speed of sound=340 m/s.

M/S or m/s may also refer to:

 Motor ship, also MS, MV, M/V, or motor vessel, a maritime prefix
 M/S stereo coding (Mid/Side stereo encoding), in audio engineering
 millier/second (BDSM)
 Messrs., especially in India as a prefix to a firm or company name.

See also
 m/s/s, Metre per second squared
 m/s/s/s,  Jerk (physics)
 MS (disambiguation)
 M&S (disambiguation)